Sven Vermant (born 4 April 1973) is a Belgian former professional football manager and former player who played as a midfielder. He is best known for his spells at Club Brugge and FC Schalke 04.

Club career
Born in Lier, Vermant started his career in 1978 at KV Hooikt and played there until 1989 when he moved to KV Mechelen, that had won the UEFA Cup Winners' Cup the year before. In 1993 Vermant moved to Club Brugge, where he won both the championship (1996, 1998) and the Belgian Cup (1995, 1996) twice.

Vermant stayed at Bruges until he transferred to FC Schalke 04 in 2001, after being heavily linked with a move to Scottish club Rangers. At Schalke he won the 2001–02 DFB-Pokal.

In 2005, Vermant returned to Club Brugge where he played until 2008. On 9 December 2007, he played his 400th game for Club Brugge against KSV Roeselare, which they won 2–1. Vermant is the ninth player in the history of the club to achieve this milestone.

In July 2008 his transferred to Royal Knokke from the Provincial League.

International career
Vermant collected 18 caps with the Belgium national team and was in the team for the 2002 World Cup. He made his debut on 23 August 1995 in a 2–1 loss against Germany.

Coaching career
Vermant was set to become assistant manager of Club Brugge's youth system, signing a contract due to take effect in May 2011.

Personal life
Sven Vermant is married to Stefanie Van Vyve (Miss Belgian Beauty 1995). They have a daughter, Elena (° 1999) and a son, Romeo (° 2004). His son Romeo plays football at Club Brugge.

Career statistics

Honours
Club Brugge

 Belgian First Division: 1995–96, 1997–98
 Belgian Cup: 1994–95, 1995–96; runner-up 1997–98
 Belgian Supercup: 1994, 1996, 1998, 2005
 Bruges Matins: 1993, 1995, 1996, 1998, 2000
 Jules Pappaert Cup: 1995

Schalke 04
DFB-Pokal: 2001–02
UEFA Intertoto Cup: 2003, 2004

Belgium
 FIFA Fair Play Trophy: 2002 World Cup

References

External links
 
 Sven Vermant at Club Brugge

1973 births
Living people
People from Lier, Belgium
Belgian footballers
Belgium international footballers
Association football midfielders
Belgian Pro League players
Bundesliga players
Regionalliga players
K.V. Mechelen players
Club Brugge KV players
FC Schalke 04 players
FC Schalke 04 II players
2002 FIFA World Cup players
Footballers from Antwerp Province